Bengala (wrestler) is a ring name used by several Mexican professional wrestlers

Bengala (CMLL), masked wrestler working for Consejo Mundial de Lucha Libre, real name unrevealed
Ricky Marvin, the first person to use the ring name "Bengala" for Lucha Libre AAA Worldwide (AAA) 2014–2016
Súper Nova, second wrestler to work as "Bengala" for AAA, used the name  2016–2019.
Arkángel Divino, third wrestler to work as Bengala in AAA, made his debut under the name in September 2019
El Halcón, used the name 1969–1970
Canelo Casas, used the name early in his career from 2006

Masked wrestlers
Mexican male professional wrestlers